Marijana Radovanović (born 8 November 1972 in Belgrade, Yugoslavia), known by her stage name Maja Marijana, is a Serbian pop-folk singer and TV presenter who has considerable success in former Yugoslav countries. She has made eleven albums since she started singing in 1992.

Singles and songs
Her most famous singles are:
Napraviću lom (2005)
Crni panter (2006)
Žena zmija (2008)
Haos (2010)
Za tugu su narodnjaci zakon (2011)
Šampion (2011)
Manijak (2012)

References

External links
Maja Marijana at Facebook
Maja Marijana Interview
Maja Marijana Interview 2

Official website of Maja Marijana

1972 births
Living people
Singers from Belgrade
21st-century Serbian women singers
Grand Production artists
Serbian turbo-folk singers